Kathleen H. Wilber (born  1948) is a professor of gerontology and policy planning and development at the University of Southern California. At the USC Leonard Davis School of Gerontology, she holds the title of Mary Pickford Foundation Professor of Gerontology. Wilber also holds an appointment in Health Services Administration in the School of Planning, Policy, and Development. She has dedicated her career to improving the quality of life of people with chronic physical and mental health conditions, by improving the formal health and long term care delivery system. The collaborative relationships among health care providers, cost effectiveness and health outcomes of different service delivery structures are more specific examples of her research.

References

External links
University of Southern California Davis School of Gerontology
Kathleen Wilber's research group: A Secure Old Age
Kathleen Wilber's publications
University of Southern California

American gerontologists
Manhattanville College alumni
University of Southern California faculty
1948 births
Living people
Women medical researchers